Kim Bo-kyung (born 1989) is a South Korean footballer.

Kim Bo-kyung (actress) (born 1976), South Korean actress
 Kim Bo-kyung, birth name of the singer Stephanie in the South Korean band The Grace

See also
 Kim (Korean surname), family name
 Bo-kyung, given name